Jacob Thomas Woods (born September 3, 1981) is a former professional baseball pitcher. He played all or part of four seasons in Major League Baseball from 2005-08. He batted and threw left-handed.

After attending Bakersfield College, a junior college, Woods was drafted by the Los Angeles Angels of Anaheim in the 3rd round (89th overall) of the 2001 Major League Baseball Draft. He made his major league debut in 2005 with the Angels, compiling a 1-1 record with a 4.55 ERA in 28.2 innings. Woods also played for the Cedar Rapids Kernels, an Angels affiliate, in 2002, ending the season 10-5 with a .667% W-L percentage with a 3.05 ERA and 121 strikeouts in 27 games pitched.

He was claimed off waivers by the Seattle Mariners on December 20, 2005. Beginning the 2006 season as a long reliever out of the bullpen, Woods was moved into the starting rotation after the late season demotion of Joel Piñeiro. Woods spent most of 2008 with Triple-A Tacoma, but was called up in August. He refused a minor league assignment on November 13, 2008, and became a free agent.

In January 2009, he signed a minor league contract with the Philadelphia Phillies. After pitching in Triple-A Lehigh Valley for just over a full season, Woods was released on April 18, 2010. In early May 2010 he signed with Brother Elephants baseball team in Taiwan to finish his professional career.

Woods resides in Kingsburg, California.

External links

Major League Baseball pitchers
Los Angeles Angels players
Seattle Mariners players
Provo Angels players
Cedar Rapids Kernels players
Rancho Cucamonga Quakes players
Arkansas Travelers players
Salt Lake Stingers players
Tacoma Rainiers players
Lehigh Valley IronPigs players
Bakersfield Renegades baseball players
Baseball players from California
1981 births
Living people
People from Fresno, California
People from Kingsburg, California